Yego is a surname of Kenyan origin that may refer to:

Alfred Kirwa Yego (born 1986), Kenyan 800 metres runner and 2007 world champion
Hillary Yego (born 1992), Kenyan steeplechase runner
John Yego (born 1988), Kenyan middle-distance runner now competing for Bahrain as Belal Mansoor Ali
Julius Yego (born 1989), Kenyan javelin thrower
Gideon Yego (born 1965), Kenyan 400 metres hurdler
Paul Yego (born 1968), Kenyan marathon runner
Solomon Kirwa Yego (born 1987), Kenyan half marathon runner

See also
Kipyego

Kalenjin names